Oliver "Olli" Caldwell (born 11 June 2002) is a British racing driver who is competing for Alpine in the FIA World Endurance Championship. He is a race winner in the FIA Formula 3, Formula Regional European, Italian F4 and ADAC Formula 4 championships and was a member of the Alpine Academy.

Career

Karting 
Caldwell was born in Hampshire, and began karting in 2013 at the age of eleven. Having raced in karts for four seasons, Caldwell finished third in the 2016 edition of the Rotax Euro Challenge and took part in the Rotax Max Challenge Grand Finals in the same year. He later credited representing Great Britain at the latter competition, where he finished eighth and broke the then-lap record, as his best moment of his five-year karting career.

Ginetta Junior Championship 
In 2016, Caldwell progressed into car racing, driving for JHR Developments in the second half of the Ginetta Junior Championship. Having scored a rookie podium on his debut, the Brit would finish all but two of his thirteen races in the top ten, ending up 19th in the overall standings.

Formula 4

F4 British Championship 

Having taken part in multiple tests of the F4 British Championship in the first half of 2017, Caldwell made his single-seater debut at the Croft Circuit with Arden, which, as he had missed the opening third of the campaign due to age requirements, made him the youngest ever participant in a British F4 race at the age of 15. He competed in the series for the remainder of that year, finishing 14th with a highest finishing position of seventh, which he recorded in three separate events. In addition to that, the Brit amassed a total of 14 podiums, which included five victories, in the Challenge Cup, the series' equivalent to a rookie championship.

ADAC Formula 4 

That same year, Caldwell made his debut in the ADAC Formula 4 Championship, driving for ADAC Berlin-Brandenburg e.V. His highest finish that year was ended up being a 17th place at the Nürburgring, as Caldwell was not classified in the standings due to his status as a guest driver.

In 2018 he made the full-time switch to Prema where he finished in 7th on 125 points, scoring four podiums, with one of them being his only win of the season at Oschersleben.

Italian F4 Championship

Mücke Motorsport was the team Caldwell made his Italian F4 debut for in 2017. In the fifteen races he competed in he recorded ten points, with a highest placing of sixth in the final race at Monza helping him to 11th in the standings.

In 2018 Caldwell switched to the Italian outfit Prema Powerteam, partnering Enzo Fittipaldi and Gianluca Petecof for the entire season. A slow start to the season at Adria which included a fightback to eighth in Race 3 after being sent down the order due to a first lap incident, which he labelled as "disappointing", was cancelled out by two podiums, a pole position and a race win in France. Three podiums from all three Monza races put Caldwell into the championship hunt, although the following two rounds only yielded one podium finish, setting his hopes of winning the title back significantly. However, a dominant weekend at the Vallelunga Circuit, where the Brit scored all three victories after qualifying on pole for every race, gave him a fighting chance for the season finale at Mugello. Two podiums at the final round would not be enough to claim the title, as Caldwell finished third in the standings, being beaten by teammate Fittipaldi and Bhaitech driver Leonardo Lorandi.

Formula 4 UAE 
Caldwell competed in the F4 UAE Championship for Silberpfeil Energy Dubai in preparation for his 2018 season. He would only race in the first two rounds, winning three races and ending up seventh in the championship.

Formula Regional European Championship

In 2019, Caldwell remained with Prema, progressing to the Formula Regional European Championship alongside Enzo Fittipaldi and Frederik Vesti. Having started his season with a fourth-placed finish in Race 1 of Le Castellet after losing his front row advantage when teammate Fittipaldi rejoined the track after going off at turn eight, which forced Caldwell to take avoiding action which lost him a number of positions, the Brit took a lights-to-flag victory in Race 2. However, Caldwell ended up being disqualified after his team had been found to have committed a technical infringement. He capped off his weekend by finishing fourth in Race 3, profiting from a collision between Igor Fraga and Raúl Guzmán. At the following round in Vallelunga Caldwell experienced difficulties in qualifying, although he would recover his weekend by scoring a podium in the second race. His next weekend at the Hungaroring, a circuit that Caldwell had not raced upon before, would end up being a success, as he took podiums in all three races and missed out on taking victory by the barest of margins after Vesti had experienced a technical issue at the end of the final lap in Race 3. The fourth event of the year at the Red Bull Ring started off with meager results in qualifying and a disappointing seventh place in Race 1. Yet more misfortune would befall Caldwell in Race 2, as, having fought his way to second through a series of challenging overtakes, his gearbox would fail, costing him his "best chance of a win".

Caldwell would bounce back after the summer break at the round in Imola, where, despite a crash in Race 3, he would score two second places in the opening two races of the weekend and win Race 4, which was held as a re-run of the cancelled third race at Vallelunga. As this had been the weekend during which Formula 2 driver Anthoine Hubert had been killed at Spa-Francorchamps, Caldwell decided to dedicate his victory to the late Frenchman. In Barcelona, Caldwell was fighting for a podium position in Race 1 until being forced into the gravel by Fittipaldi, which left the Brit down in seventh place. Two further points finishes completed the weekend, although at the next round in Mugello Caldwell experienced his worst weekend of the season, scoring a mere three points and getting his first and only non-points finish of the season. He ended his campaign with three top-eight finishes at Monza, as Caldwell finished fifth in the championship, a long way off teammates Vesti and Fittipaldi.

FIA Formula 3 Championship

Macau Grand Prix 
On 4 November 2019, Caldwell announced he will be racing for the Trident team at the 2019 Macau Grand Prix. Caldwell qualified 17th, 1.6 seconds behind pole-sitter Jüri Vips with a time of 2:06.641. In the qualifying race Caldwell got caught up in an incident at the start where Sargeant braked later than other drivers and his front wing glanced Maini's rear-right wheel. Maini was sent into a spin and rested against a trackside wall in a way that caused his vehicle to protrude at the exit of Lisboa turn, blocking Caldwell, who lost a number of positions. In the end he finished in 23rd meaning he started the race near the back. At the start of the race Caldwell made contact with Andreas Estner and on the fourth lap, Caldwell retired from the consequences of the earlier collision that damaged his front wing and a tyre.

2020 
In January Caldwell was announced by Trident as one of their three drivers for the 2020 Formula 3 season, partnering the experienced pairing of David Beckmann and Lirim Zendeli. The Brit had a successful start to the year, finishing in the top six in both races at the second round at Spielberg. Unfortunately, Caldwell then had to endure four successive rounds without any points, a run that included him being spun out in the feature race at Silverstone. Caldwell managed to break that streak by finishing seventh in the Barcelona feature race. His final points of the year came at the penultimate round in Monza, and he ended up 16th in the drivers' standings.

2021 

Caldwell was announced to be racing for Prema Racing in the 2021 season, partnering Arthur Leclerc and Dennis Hauger. He won the second race of the season in Barcelona, after he inherited the race lead when the leading pair of Hauger and Matteo Nannini collided on the penultimate lap. Caldwell held off a charging Victor Martins on the final lap to take his first F3 victory, stating afterwards that he was "over the moon with the result". While his next round wasn't as successful, with only nine points taken from the weekend, the Brit returned to the podium at the Red Bull Ring, where he finished second in race one and third in race three, where he made his way past five cars on the way to the rostrum. Caldwell's next podium finish occurred at the next race in Budapest, with him being promoted to second place after initial race winner Lorenzo Colombo received a five-second penalty. A collision with Oliver Rasmussen in Race 2 scuppered his hopes of scoring points, although he came back to eighth place in the feature race after a string of midfield battles. However, a disappointing weekend at Spa where the whole team qualified outside the top 12, a broken DRS in qualifying at Zandvoort and the decision to choose a wet-weather setup in Sochi, where the races were held in dry conditions despite the predicted rain, meant a poor last half of the season in which he didn't manage to finish on the podium. Caldwell ended his campaign eighth in the drivers' standings, two places ahead of teammate Leclerc.

FIA Formula 2 Championship

2021 
In November 2021 Caldwell announced that he would be joining Campos Racing to partner Ralph Boschung in the final two rounds of the FIA Formula 2 Championship. Despite experiencing a difficult debut weekend the Brit stated that the jump from F3 to F2 "wasn't as big as [he] expected", but also said that he had to improve his tyre warm-up in qualifying, which had cost him "around 1-1.5 seconds". After the final round of the campaign, where he set a fastest lap in the first sprint race following a late stop after a racing incident with Jake Hughes, Caldwell took part in the post-season test with the Spanish team.

2022 

Caldwell stepped up to Formula 2 full-time for the 2022 season, remaining with Campos and still having Boschung as his teammate, whose experience Caldwell cited as being the deciding factor behind his decision of signing with the team, saying that Boschung would be "an experienced reference in the other car". Having qualified 17th in the first round at Bahrain, the Brit was forced to drop out of the sprint race due to an engine issue. The following day Caldwell experienced a wretched race, as he received two penalty points and a 10-second stop-and-go penalty for being out of position on the formation lap and five penalty points for exceeding the track limits at turn 4 on six occasions, for which he received 5-second-, 10-second- and drive through penalties. The following round in Saudi Arabia once again brought 17th place in qualifying, although he once again received a penalty point coupled with a three-place grid penalty for the sprint race after he had been judged to have impeded Jüri Vips during the session. The Brit finished ahead of teammate Boschung for the first time in the sprint race after the Swiss driver had received a 20-second time penalty, and ended up just a second behind him in the feature race following the use of an alternate strategy.

Caldwell missed out on points once again at Imola, although he did end up getting his then best ever F2 result with 13th place, which he managed to reach in the following round at Barcelona. The next three rounds did not yield points either, although Caldwell was able to outqualify Boschung for the first time at his home track at Silverstone. At the Red Bull Ring in Austria however, Caldwell would get up to eleventh by the end of the race after starting from last place, which eventually became sixth place after multiple penalties ahead of him, including one for Frederik Vesti, who had overtaken Caldwell whilst off the track, had been handed out. In France, he would experience a disappointing weekend despite some promising pace, as Caldwell missed out on setting his final laptime by a couple of seconds at the end of qualifying, which put him toward the back of the grid and meant only a 13th place in the feature race. In the qualifying session of the following round in Hungary, Caldwell managed to qualify 13th, his best qualifying result up to that date. He ended up finishing tenth in the sprint race, however a strong feature race was undone after his fuel ran out on the final lap. Near the end of the race, he also committed a track limits infringement, which earned Caldwell a twelfth penalty point, meaning that he would miss the following event at Spa-Francorchamps. Following the announcement, Caldwell apologised to the team and stated that he would "come back stronger" after the summer break.

On his return at Zandvoort, Caldwell outqualified teammate Boschung, but would retire from the sprint race after experiencing brake issues which caused him to go into the gravel in the first corner. He bounced back in the feature race, taking advantage of a pileup at the Safety car restart to finish ninth, having held off attacks from Jehan Daruvala throughout the final third of the race. Following a penalty to David Beckmann, Caldwell was elevated to eighth. At the conclusion of the weekend, Caldwell was quoted as being "very happy" with his result, whilst also acknowledging the degree of good fortune that he and the team had experienced. The next round at Monza would bring two retirements, as Caldwell retired from lap 1 of both races due to collisions with Tatiana Calderón and Théo Pourchaire respectively. At the final round, Caldwell finished ahead of teammate Boschung in the sprint race, being classified 16th, but would retire from the feature race following a mechanical issue with a couple of laps remaining. Caldwell ended up finishing 21st in the standings with 12 points to his name. Despite this challenging season, the Briton stated that 2022 had been a "huge year" for him, owing to his opportunities with Alpine in F1.

Kush Maini replaced Caldwell at Campos for the 2023 season and the Brit left the series.

Formula One 
In February 2022, the Alpine F1 Team announced that Caldwell would be joining the team's academy, alongside former F3 rivals Jack Doohan, Victor Martins and Caio Collet. Academy director Mia Sharizman said about Caldwell that "we accept it might take a few races for [him] to adjust to [his] new surroundings, but we’re confident [he] will hit the ground running towards the second half of the season.". Caldwell himself was quoted as saying that he was "excited to join the Academy", and that the pressure added to him was "good pressure to have in order to keep pushing". On the 14 June it was confirmed that Caldwell would drive the team's 2021 car, the Alpine A521, at his home track in Silverstone in a test, taking over from Alpine reserve driver Oscar Piastri the following day. Having completed a total of 485.7 kilometres of running throughout the day, Caldwell commented that it had been "everything I expected and more" and thanked the Alpine F1 Team for enabling him to drive the car. In November of the same year Caldwell tested the car once again, completing more than 100 laps around the Bahrain International Circuit. At the start of 2023, it was announced that Caldwell had graduated from the Alpine Academy.

Sportscar racing

GT4 
At the end of 2018 Caldwell made his GT racing debut in the Gulf 12 Hours, where, having taken the Race 1 win by leading after 6 Hours of the race, he took victory in the GT4 category, driving a Mercedes for Bullit Racing alongside Ian Loggie and Oleg Kharuk.

GT3 
In early 2020 it was confirmed that the Brit would drive alongside Marvin Kirchhöfer and Luca Ghiotto in the Bathurst 12 Hour race for R-Motorsport. However, the trio was forced to miss the race as a crash from Kirchhöfer in the second part of qualifying broke the Vantage AMR GT3 car, which forced the team to withdraw from the event. Despite the premature withdrawal, Caldwell described the event as "an amazing experience".

FIA World Endurance Championship 
On 3 November 2021 it was announced that Caldwell would be making his debut in the FIA World Endurance Championship, driving alongside Miro Konôpka and Nelson Panciatici for the ARC Bratislava team in the 2021 8 Hours of Bahrain. The trio finished the race eleventh in the LMP2 category.

The following year, Caldwell competed in the series' rookie test at Bahrain in November, driving the Richard Mille Racing Team LMP2 car during the afternoon session. He ended up setting the second-fastest time of all rookies in the category.

2023 season 
For the 2023 season, Caldwell would move into the World Endurance Championship on a full-time basis, partnering the experienced pairing of André Negrão and Memo Rojas for the Alpine Elf Team in the LMP2 class. The campaign began disappointingly at the 1000 Miles of Sebring, where, with Negrão having qualified twelfth and last, Caldwell was forced to retire after five hours due to an electrical issue.

Personal life
As of 2022, Caldwell lives in Oxford alongside Formula 2 driver and Mercedes Junior Frederik Vesti.

Karting record

Karting career summary

Complete Rotax Max Challenge Grand Finals results

Racing record

Racing career summary 

† As Caldwell was a guest driver, he was ineligible to score points.
* Season still in progress.

Complete Ginetta Junior Championship results 
(key) (Races in bold indicate pole position) (Races in italics indicate fastest lap)

Complete F4 British Championship results 
(key) (Races in bold indicate pole position) (Races in italics indicate fastest lap)

Complete Italian F4 Championship results
(key) (Races in bold indicate pole position) (Races in italics indicate fastest lap)

Complete ADAC Formula 4 Championship results
(key) (Races in bold indicate pole position) (Races in italics indicate fastest lap)

† As Caldwell was a guest driver, he was ineligible to score points.

Complete Gulf 12 Hours results

Complete Formula Regional European Championship results
(key) (Races in bold indicate pole position; races in italics indicate fastest lap)

Complete Macau Grand Prix results

Complete FIA Formula 3 Championship results
(key) (Races in bold indicate pole position; races in italics indicate points for the fastest lap of top ten finishers)

‡ Half points awarded as less than 75% of race distance was completed.

Complete FIA Formula 2 Championship results 
(key) (Races in bold indicate pole position) (Races in italics indicate points for the fastest lap of top ten finishers)

† Driver did not finish the race, but was classified as they completed more than 90% of the race distance.

Complete FIA World Endurance Championship results
(key) (Races in bold indicate pole position) (Races in italics indicate fastest lap)

* Season still in progress.

References

External links
 
 

2002 births
Living people
English racing drivers
Ginetta Junior Championship drivers
ADAC Formula 4 drivers
British F4 Championship drivers
Italian F4 Championship drivers
Formula Regional European Championship drivers
FIA Formula 3 Championship drivers
FIA Formula 2 Championship drivers
Arden International drivers
Mücke Motorsport drivers
Prema Powerteam drivers
Trident Racing drivers
Campos Racing drivers
Sportspeople from Winchester
FIA World Endurance Championship drivers
R-Motorsport drivers
JHR Developments drivers
Aston Martin Racing drivers
UAE F4 Championship drivers
Signature Team drivers